Southern Punjab cricket team may refer to:

 Southern Punjab cricket team (India)
 Southern Punjab cricket team (Pakistan)